Coccodus is an extinct genus of extinct pycnodontid fish that lived during the lower Cenomanian.  The various species had a pair of massive, curved spines emanating from the lower sides of the head, and one curved spine on the top of its head.  Unlike most pycnodontids (which tend to have short, marine butterflyfish-like bodies), Coccodus species had a comparatively long body, giving the living animals a superficial resemblance to a scaly chimaera.

Coccodus is closely related to the similarly spined genera Trewavasia, Corusichthys, Paracoccodus, and Hensodon, which also lived during the Cenomanian of Lebanon.

Formerly in Coccodus
The species Coccodus lindstroemi was recently determined to be a species complex, and various specimens assigned to C. lindstroemi were redescribed as species of the gladiopycnodontid genus Joinivillichthys

See also

 Prehistoric fish
 List of prehistoric bony fish

References

Pycnodontiformes genera
Late Cretaceous fish of Asia
Cretaceous bony fish